Thomas McCarty was a member of the Wisconsin State Assembly.

Biography
McCarty was born on October 29, 1838 in Buffalo, New York. He would own a farm in Menomonee, Wisconsin. On February 6, 1894, McCarty married Alice Boyle. They would have seven children. McCarty and his family were Roman Catholics.

Political career
McCarty was a member of the Assembly during the 1870 and 1877 sessions. Other positions he held include Chairman of the town board (similar to city council) of Menomonee and of the county board of Waukesha County, Wisconsin. He was a Democrat.

References

Politicians from Buffalo, New York
People from Menomonee Falls, Wisconsin
Democratic Party members of the Wisconsin State Assembly
County supervisors in Wisconsin
Mayors of places in Wisconsin
Wisconsin city council members
19th-century Roman Catholics
Farmers from Wisconsin
1838 births
Year of death missing
Catholics from New York (state)
Catholics from Wisconsin